Bergsland may refer to:

Egil Bergsland (1924–2007), Norwegian politician
Einar Bergsland (1910–1982), Norwegian Nordic skier
Hans Bergsland (1878–1956), Norwegian Olympic fencer
Jacob Bergsland (1890–1974), Norwegian fencer
Knut Bergsland (1914–1998), Norwegian linguist
Per Bergsland (1918–1992), Norwegian World War II prisoner of war, one of three to reach freedom in the "Great Escape"